Georges Alphonse Fleury Izambard (11 December 1848 in Paris – February 1931) was a French school teacher, best known as the teacher and benefactor of poet Arthur Rimbaud. He taught at the Collège de Charleville in Charleville, where his nickname was "Zanzibar".

On 4 May 1870, Rimbaud's mother wrote to Izambard to complain about him giving Rimbaud Victor Hugo's Les Misérables to read. In May 1871, Rimbaud sent an important letter to Izambard. In this letter, (which includes the poem "Le Cœur supplicié"), he affirms that he wants to be a poet, and that he is working to become a "voyant":

Je veux être poète, et je travaille à me rendre voyant : vous ne comprendrez pas du tout, et je ne saurais presque vous expliquer. Il s'agit d'arriver à l'inconnu par le dérèglement de tous les sens. Les souffrances sont énormes, mais il faut être fort, être né poète, et je me suis reconnu poète. Ce n'est pas du tout ma faute. C'est faux de dire : Je pense : on devrait dire : On me pense. − Pardon du jeu de mots. − Je est un autre. Tant pis pour le bois qui se trouve violon, et nargue aux inconscients, qui ergotent sur ce qu'ils ignorent tout à fait !

Translated: 
I wish to be a poet, and I am working to make myself into a seer: you will not understand at all, and I would not nearly know how to explain it to you. It's a question of coming to the unknown through the disordering of all the senses. The suffering is enormous, but one must be strong, be born a poet, and I have come to terms with my destiny as a poet. It's not at all my fault. It's wrong to say "I think"; one ought to say "I am being thought"  - Forgive the play on words - I is another. Too bad for the wood which finds itself a violin, and brush off the oblivious, who quibble over things they know nothing about!

Published works

References

Notes

Sources

External links 
Letter from Rimbaud to Izambard 

1848 births
1931 deaths
Educators from Paris
Arthur Rimbaud